Power Man may refer to:
 Luke Cage, a Marvel Comics superhero, originally called Power Man
 Erik Josten, a Marvel supervillain later known as Smuggler, Goliath and Atlas
 Victor Alvarez, the current Power Man introduced in the mini-series Shadowland: Power Man
 Power Man and Iron Fist, a comic book series about Luke Cage's adventures with Danny Rand (Iron Fist)

See also
Powerman (disambiguation)